Hong Kong competed at the 2009 World Championships in Athletics from 15–23 August in Berlin.

Team performance 

100 m (First Round Heats)
  (Heat 12) Chi Ho Tsui—Lane 5, -- 10.77s (Rank 6) -- Did not qualify

References

External links
Official competition website

Nations at the 2009 World Championships in Athletics
World Championships in Athletics
Hong Kong at the World Championships in Athletics